Barhi  Assembly constituency   is an assembly constituency in  the Indian state of Jharkhand.

Overview
Barhi police station in Hazaribagh district and Chauparan police station in Hazaribagh district.
 
Barhi assembly constituency is part of Hazaribagh (Lok Sabha constituency). There are four blocks under the jurisdiction of Barhi Assembly constituency- Barhi, Chauparan, Padma in Hazaribagh district and Chandwara in Koderma district. Two new administrative blocks (Padma and Chandwara) were created during the 1990s when Ram Lakhan Singh was the MLA of the constituency.  The constituency covers 64 panchyats under these four blocks- Barhi (20 panchayats), Chauparan (26 panchayats), Padma (8 Panchayats) and Chadwara (10 panchayats). Entire Barhi constituency is divided into 318 polling booths.

Members of Legislative Assembly

Election results

2019

 
 
 
 

Umashankar Akela of BJP won in the Barhi assembly constituency defeating Manoj Kumar Yadav of Congress in 2009. Manoj Kumar Yadav of Congress defeated Umashankar Akela representing SP in 2005, and Mahaveer Sahu of BJP in 2000 and 1995. Ram Lakhan Singh of CPI defeated Manoj Kumar Yadav of Congress in 1990. Niranjan Prasad Singh of Congress defeated Ram Lakhan Singh of CPI in 1985 and 1980. Lalita Rajya Lakshmi of Janata Party defeated Matinul Hasan of Congress in 1977.

See also
Vidhan Sabha
List of states of India by type of legislature

References
Schedule – XIII of Constituencies Order, 2008 of Delimitation of Parliamentary and Assembly constituencies Order, 2008 of the Election Commission of India 

Assembly constituencies of Jharkhand